37 (thirty-seven) is the natural number following 36 and preceding 38.

In mathematics
37 is the 12th prime number and the third unique prime in decimal. 37 is the first irregular prime, and the third isolated prime without a twin prime. It is also the third cuban prime, the fourth emirp, and the fifth lucky prime.
37 is the third star number and the fourth centered hexagonal number.  
The sum of the squares of the first 37 primes is divisible by 37.
Every positive integer is the sum of at most 37 fifth powers (see Waring's problem).
37 appears in the Padovan sequence, preceded by the terms 16, 21, and 28 (it is the sum of the first two of these).
Since the greatest prime factor of 372 + 1 = 1370 is 137, which is substantially more than 37 twice, 37 is a Størmer number.

In base-ten, 37 is a permutable prime with 73, which is the 21st prime number. By extension, the mirroring of their digits and prime indexes makes 73 the only Sheldon prime. 

In moonshine theory, whereas all p ⩾ 73 are non-supersingular primes, the smallest such prime is 37. 

There are exactly 37 complex reflection groups.

In decimal 
For a three-digit number that is divisible by 37, a rule of divisibility is that another divisible by 37 can be generated by transferring first digit onto the end of a number. For example: 37|148 ➜ 37|481 ➜ 37|814.

Any multiple of 37 can be mirrored and spaced with a zero each for another multiple of 37. For example, 37 and 703, 74 and 407, and 518 and 80105 are all multiples of 37.
 
Any multiple of 37 with a three-digit repunit inserted generates another multiple of 37. For example, 30007, 31117, 74, 70004 and 78884 are all multiples of 37.

In science
 The atomic number of rubidium
 The normal human body temperature in degrees Celsius

Astronomy
 Messier object M37, a magnitude 6.0 open cluster in the constellation Auriga
 The New General Catalogue object NGC 37, a spiral galaxy in the constellation Phoenix
 Kepler-37b is the smallest known planet.
 NGC 2169 is known as the 37 Cluster, due to its resemblance of the numerals.

In sports

José María López used this number during his successful years in the World Touring Car Championship from 2014 until 2016. He still uses this number in Formula E since joining in 2016-17 season with DS Virgin Racing.

In other fields

Thirty-seven is:
 The number of the French department Indre-et-Loire
 The number of slots in European roulette (numbered 0 to 36, the 00 is not used in European roulette as it is in American roulette)
 The number of Great Nats traditionally worshiped in Burma
 The RSA public exponent used by PuTTY
 +37 was the international dialing code of the German Democratic Republic (aka East Germany). Today the +37 prefix is shared by Lithuania (+370), Latvia (+371), Estonia (+372), Moldova (+373), Armenia (+374), Belarus (+375), Andorra (+376), Monaco (+377), San Marino (+378) and Vatican City (+379).
 The number of seconds of church-bell and thunderstorm recording before the opening tritone riff in the song "Black Sabbath" on the album Black Sabbath by the band Black Sabbath, which is considered to mark the birth of heavy metal music.
 Richard Nixon, 37th president of the United States.

See also
 List of highways numbered 37
 Number Thirty-Seven, Pennsylvania, unincorporated community in Cambria County, Pennsylvania
 I37 (disambiguation)

References

External links

37 Heaven Large collection of facts and links about this number.

Integers